Richard Wells may refer to:
Sir Richard Wells (Royal Navy officer) (1833–1896), British admiral
Sir Richard Wells, 1st Baronet (1879–1957), Conservative Member of Parliament for Bedford
Richard Wells (nurse) (1950–1993), British nurse, nursing adviser and health care administrator
Richard M. Wells (born 1929), Major General of United States Army, director of Defense Mapping Agency
Richard Wells (composer), British film, TV and games composer
C. Richard Wells, American evangelical pastor, theologian, and college president
Richard Wells (cricketer) (born 1956), Rhodesian-born English cricketer
Richard W. Wells, Australian herpetologist